Bartłomiej Eizenchart (born 23 August 2001) is a Polish professional footballer who plays as a left-back or left winger for I liga side Resovia.

Career statistics

Club

References

External links

2001 births
Living people
People from Łęczyca
Polish footballers
Association football defenders
Górnik Zabrze players
Puszcza Niepołomice players
GKS Bełchatów players
Resovia (football) players
III liga players
I liga players
Poland youth international footballers